The West Texas Wildcatters were a professional indoor football team based in Odessa, Texas. The Wildcatters played their home games at the Ector County Coliseum. The Wildcatters began play in 2014 an expansion team in the Lone Star Football League (LSFL). They had planned on joining the CIF in 2014 during the merger of the LSFL and Champions Professional Indoor Football League (CPIFL), but were left out of the league.

The Wildcatters were the second indoor football team to call Odessa home, following the West Texas Roughnecks (originally the Odessa Roughnecks) which played in Intense Football League in 2004 and again from 2006 to 2008, the National Indoor Football League in 2005, the Indoor Football League from 2009 to 2011 and the LSFL from 2012 to 2013 before folding after they could not find a new owner.

After the 2014 season the Lone Star Football League merged with the Champions Professional Indoor Football League (CPIFL) to become the Champions Indoor Football (CIF). The Venom and Bandits became part of the new league while the Sol joined the X-League Indoor Football (XLIF), but the Wildcatters have made no announcement of which league they would join and are now considered defunct.

Roster

Head coaches

Season-by-season results

References

External links
 West Texas Wildcatters official website

Lone Star Football League teams
Defunct American football teams in Texas
Sports in Odessa, Texas
American football teams established in 2013
American football teams disestablished in 2014
2013 establishments in Texas
2014 disestablishments in Texas